Fyodor Aleksandrovich Abramov (29 February 192014 May 1983) was a Russian novelist and literary critic. His work focused on the difficult lives of the Russian peasant class. He was frequently reprimanded for deviations from Soviet policy on writing.

Biography

Abramov was from a peasant background. He studied at Leningrad State University, but put his schooling on hold to serve as a soldier in World War II. In 1951 he finished his schooling at the university, then remained as a teacher until 1960. After he left the university he became a full-time writer.

His essay, written in 1954, "People in the Kolkhoz Village in Postwar Prose", which addressed the glorified portrayal of life in Communist Soviet Villages, was denounced by the Writers' Union and the Central Committee. In a later essay, Abramov argued for the repeal of the law that denied peasants internal passports; he also recommended giving the peasantry larger shares of the profits of their labors. This essay led to his removal from the editorial staff of the journal Neva.

His first novel entitled, "Bratya i syostri" ("Brothers and Sisters") was written in 1958. It dealt with the harsh life of northern Russian villagers during World War II. Abramov wrote two sequels to "Bratya i syostri", entitled, "Dve zimy i tri leta" ("Two Winters and Three Summers"), written in 1968, and "Puti-pereputya" (“Paths and Crossroads”), written in 1973. He also wrote a fourth novel in 1978 called "Dom" ("The House").

Abramov started another novel, "Chistaya kniga", but did not finish it before his death in May 1983.

The asteroid 3409 Abramov, discovered by Soviet astronomer Nikolai Chernykh in 1977, is named after him.

English Translations
 The Dodgers, Flegon Press in association with Anthony Blond, 1963.
 The New Life: A Day on a Collective Farm, Grove Press, 1963. (Alternative translation of The Dodgers)
 Two Winters and Three Summers, Harcourt Brace Jovanovich, 1984.
 The Swans Flew By and Other Stories, Raduga Publishers, 1986.
 "Olesha's Cabin" in The Barsukov Triangle, the Two-Toned Blond and other Stories, Ardis, 1984.

Novels
 Bratya i syostri (Brothers and Sisters), 1958.
 Dve zimy i tri leta (Two Winters and Three Summers), 1968.
 Puti-pereputya (Paths and Crossroads), 1973.
 Dom (The House), 1978.
 "Chistaya kniga" ("Clean book"), Unfinished

Sources 
 "Fyodor Abramov", Encyclopædia Britannica, 2009, Encyclopædia Britannica Online, 5 May 2009

References

External links
 

1920 births
1983 deaths
People from Pinezhsky District
People from Pinezhsky Uyezd
Russian male novelists
Soviet novelists
Soviet male writers
20th-century Russian male writers
Soviet short story writers
20th-century Russian short story writers
Russian male essayists
Soviet educators
Russian male short story writers
20th-century essayists
Soviet literary historians
Saint Petersburg State University alumni
Soviet military personnel of World War II
Recipients of the Order of Lenin
Recipients of the USSR State Prize